John Angelo may refer to:

 John Angelo Jackson (1921–2005), English mountaineer, educationalist, and author
 John Angelo Lester (1858–1934), American physician
 John Angelo, Canadian politician; see

See also

John Angelos (disambiguation)
John Angel (disambiguation)